LondonMetric Property plc is a British property company. It is listed on the London Stock Exchange and is a constituent of the FTSE 250 Index.

History
The company was established by Raymond Mould and Patrick Vaughan in October 2007 as London & Stamford Property plc and admitted to the Alternative Investment Market in November 2007. It came to prominence when it acquired a significant stake in the Meadowhall Shopping Centre from British Land in February 2009. It was first listed on the London Stock Exchange and became a REIT in October 2010. In January 2013 it merged with Metric Property Investments to form LondonMetric Property.

Operations

The company has circa 100 property investments, all located in the UK. The company's investment properties were valued at £3.6 billion as at 31 March 2022.

References

External links
Official Website
Landlord Assured

British companies established in 2007
Property companies of the United Kingdom
Real estate investment trusts of the United Kingdom
Companies based in the City of Westminster
2007 in London
2007 establishments in England